Brookhill is a rural locality in the City of Townsville, Queensland, Australia.

Geography 
Brookhill is a valley between Mount Stuart (584 metres) and Mount Elliot. (1218 metres). The Flinders Highway and the Great Northern Railway form the western boundary of the locality. The land is predominantly used for cattle grazing.

History 
The locality was named and bounded on 27 July 1991.

Education 
There are no schools in Brookhill. The locality is within the catchment area for Wulguru State School and William Ross State High School in Annandale.

References 

City of Townsville
Localities in Queensland